Bribbaree is a closed station on the Stockinbingal- Parkes railway line at Bribbaree, New South Wales, Australia.  It opened in 1916 and closed to passenger services in 1983 and was subsequently demolished. This line is a cross-country line connecting the Main South line and the Main West line.  It is gently graded, and provides an alternative route to the Sydney to Parkes line, which is heavily graded.

References 

Disused regional railway stations in New South Wales
Railway stations in Australia opened in 1916
Railway stations closed in 1983